Matteo Piscopo (born 9 August 1954) is a Canadian retired international soccer player.

International career
Piscopo made his debut for Canada in an April 1974 friendly match against Bermuda.

References

1954 births
Living people
Canadian soccer players
Canada men's international soccer players
Association footballers not categorized by position